Palisades Peak is a  summit located in Mount Rainier National Park in Pierce County of Washington state. It is part of the Sourdough Mountains, a subset of the Cascade Range, and is situated 0.6 mile north of Marcus Peak. The peak's descriptive name stems from the resemblance of its columnar basalt cliffs to a palisade. Access is via Palisades Lakes Trail which starts at Sunrise Point. Access to Sunrise Point is limited due to snowpack closing the Sunrise Road much of the year. July, August, and September are typically the months when the Sunrise Road is seasonally open for vehicle traffic. Precipitation runoff from Palisades Peak drains into the White River.

Climate
Palisades Peak is located in the marine west coast climate zone of western North America. Most weather fronts originate in the Pacific Ocean, and travel northeast toward the Cascade Mountains. As fronts approach, they are forced upward by the peaks of the Cascade Range (Orographic lift), causing them to drop their moisture in the form of rain or snowfall onto the Cascades. As a result, the west side of the Cascades experiences high precipitation, especially during the winter months in the form of snowfall. During winter months, weather is usually cloudy, but, due to high pressure systems over the Pacific Ocean that intensify during summer months, there is often little or no cloud cover during the summer. Because of maritime influence, snow tends to be wet and heavy, resulting in high avalanche danger.

Gallery

References

External links
 National Park Service web site: Mount Rainier National Park

Cascade Range
Mountains of Pierce County, Washington
Mountains of Washington (state)
Mount Rainier National Park